This is a list of notable awards for specific areas of science and technology. Typically these lists give the country of the sponsoring organization, the award name, sponsor name and a description of the award criteria. Some of the awards have broad scope, or cover the intersection of different disciplines, so an award may appear in more than one list. A list of general awards for science and technology is followed by the lists of more specific awards.

General list

 List of general science and technology awards

Specific lists

 List of agriculture awards
 List of archaeology awards
 List of astronomy awards
 List of aviation awards
 List of biochemistry awards
 List of biology awards
 List of biomedical science awards
 List of chemistry awards
 List of computer science awards
 List of computer-related awards
 List of earth sciences awards
 List of economics awards
 List of engineering awards
 List of environmental awards
 List of geography awards
 List of geology awards
 List of geophysics awards
 List of mathematics awards
 List of mechanical engineering awards
 List of medicine awards
 List of meteorology awards
 List of motor vehicle awards
 List of oceanography awards
 List of ornithology awards
 List of paleontology awards
 List of physics awards
 List of psychology awards
 List of science and technology awards for women
 List of social sciences awards
 List of space technology awards
 List of student science award programs

Research

In July 2020 scientists reported that work honored by Nobel prizes clusters in only a few scientific fields with only 36/71 having received at least one Nobel prize of the 114/849 domains science could be divided into according to their DC2 and DC3 classification systems. Five of the 114 domains were shown to make up over half of the Nobel prizes awarded 1995–2017 (particle physics [14%], cell biology [12.1%], atomic physics [10.9%], neuroscience [10.1%], molecular chemistry [5.3%]).

See also

 Lists of awards
 List of writing awards#Science writing awards
 List of years in science
 List of science communication awards

References